Corymica arnearia is a moth of the family Geometridae first described by Francis Walker in 1860. It is found in Japan, in Taiwan and from the Oriental tropics to Sulawesi and Borneo.

Adults have a clearly marked pale, red edged medial bar on the forewing dorsum and a corresponding narrow mark on the costa. There is also a red marginal mark on the forewing underside.

The larvae feed on Cinnamomum camphora. They are bright green with a brown head.

References

Moths described in 1860
Hypochrosini
Moths of Japan